Waddi is a village community in the central part of the Riverina on the Sturt Highway.  It is situated by road, about 2 kilometres south from Darlington Point and 29 kilometres north from Coleambally.

Notes and references

Towns in the Riverina
Towns in New South Wales
Murrumbidgee Council